Mads Andre Hansen (born 2 February 1984) is a former Norwegian footballer, and a one-hit wonder with the single "Sommerkroppen". He has previously played for Lier, Strømsgodset, Fredrikstad Fotballklubb and Mjøndalen IF. He is also an influencer, and TV-presenter.

Hansen was in 2009 awarded NRK's Gullballen for his goal for Mjøndalen against Hønefoss. He played 45 matches for Fredrikstad in Tippeligaen between 2011 and 2012

Club career
Hansen was born in Drammen and grew up in Lier, where he played for Lier before he joined Strømsgodset. He got one appearance for the team in 2002 before he left for the Third Division side Mjøndalen ahead of the 2004-season.

Hansen was one of the profiles on the team when Mjøndalen earned promotion to the First Division. On 25 October 2009 he scored the match-winning goal in the 2-1 win against league-leaders Hønefoss, a victory that saved Mjøndalen from relegation. Hansen's goal, which was a solo-raid from his own half, have been compared to Maradona's goal against England in the 1986 FIFA World Cup, and was woted Goal of the Year during NRK's Gullballen.

Hansen was wanted by Tippeligaen side Fredrikstad during the summer of 2010, and offered between 400,000 and 500,000 NOK for the midfielder position. This was rejected by Mjøndalen, and when Fredrikstad got another bid rejected after the 2010 season, which according to Drammens Tidende was 325,000 NOK, Hansen considered paying 50,000 NOK out of his own pocket to make his dream to play in Tippeligaen come true. Hansen eventually signed a three-year contract with Fredrikstad in January 2011, after external investors paid what Fredrikstad couldn't afford to pay for Hansen.

Hansen scored a goal in his debut for Fredrikstad, and was a regular for the team in the first half of the 2011 season. He only started four matches in the 2012 season due to an injury, when the team got relegated from the Tippeligaen. He played a total of 35 matches and scored two goals for Fredrikstad in Tippeligaen. Ahead of the 2013 season, Hansen rejoined his old team Mjøndalen, and signed a three-year contract with the club.

On April 27, 2018, Hansen announced he would retire from professional football, due to lack of motivation.

Career statistics

References

1984 births
Living people
People from Lier, Norway
Sportspeople from Drammen
Norwegian footballers
Strømsgodset Toppfotball players
Mjøndalen IF players
Fredrikstad FK players
Norwegian First Division players
Eliteserien players
Association football midfielders
Spellemannprisen winners